Neva Krysteva (born 2 August 1946) is a Bulgarian organist, professor of music, pedagogue, composer from Moscow State Music Academy in Music Studies and Organ, and musicologist.

Life
She continued her studies in Prague and Zürich with Prof. Jiří Rheinberger, with Yuri Holopov for musicology and Leonid Royzman and Iri Reinberger for organ. Krysteva's career is separated in three general branches - organ performances, musicology and composition. In 1978 she organized the first organ class in Bulgaria.

After completing her education, Krasteva taught organ at the National Academy of Music in Bulgaria and became head of the organ classes at New Bulgarian University. She also works as a lecturer at the National Academy of Music. Krasteva has published a number of professional articles.

Neva Krysteva has given many concerts throughout Europe: (Italy, the Netherlands, Switzerland, Germany, Austria, Russia, Hungary, the Czech Republic, Slovakia, Romania) and in Asia. Her performing career in Bulgaria - her native country - starts in 1974, after the new pipe organ in Bulgaria Concert Hall in Sofia was installed. Her repertoire includes Baroque and Romantic music as well as 20th-century works.

Krysteva's compositions are in the sphere of organ, chamber and choral music.

Works
Krasteva composes mostly solo and orchestra works for organ and choir. Selected works include: 
Рефлекси (Reflexi) (Text: after Johann Wolfgang von Goethe)
Старата икона (Starata ikona) (Text: Ivan Minchov Vazov)
Върхът (Varhat) (Text: Ivan Minchov Vazov)

References

External links
Neva Krysteva's website

1946 births
20th-century classical composers
21st-century organists
21st-century women musicians
Bulgarian classical composers
Bulgarian classical organists
Bulgarian composers
Bulgarian musicologists
Women classical composers
Bulgarian music educators
Musicians from Sofia
Women musicologists
Women organists
Living people
Women music educators
20th-century women composers